The Marine Life Park is a part of Resorts World Sentosa, Sentosa, situated in southern Singapore. The 8-hectare (20-acre) park houses two attractions, the S.E.A. Aquarium and the Adventure Cove Waterpark, and featured the largest oceanarium in the world from 2012 to 2014, until it was surpassed by Chimelong Ocean Kingdom.

S.E.A. Aquarium
The S.E.A. Aquarium (South East Asia Aquarium) was the world's largest aquarium by total water volume until overtaken by Chimelong Ocean Kingdom in Hengqin, China. The aquarium comprises 10 zones with 49 habitats. They also have a conservation group called Guardians of the S.E.A.A., which supports research, education and public engagement efforts to protect the marine environment. S.E.A. Aquarium will be rebranded to Singapore Oceanarium in 2024 when construction of an extension is expected to be completed in that same year.

Attractions 
The main attractions include:

Dining
Dining is possible at the Ocean Restaurant by Cat Cora and S.E.A. Side Snacks.

Shopping 
The gift shop located at the exit of the aquarium sells a variety of souvenirs.

Controversies 
The capture of wild dolphins from the Solomon Islands and their housing in Subic Bay, Philippines, was controversial.  Animal rights groups filed a civil rights suit, and the Quezon City court issued a 72-hour temporary environment protection order to block the re-export of the dolphins to Marine Life Park on 14 October 2012. RWS reiterated that the resort's acquisition of the 25 Indo-Pacific bottlenose dolphins adhered to regulations governed by the United Nations Environment Programme under the Convention on International Trade in Endangered Species of Wild Fauna and Flora. Following another appeal, the block on the re-exportation of the dolphins was temporarily extended. Upon expiry of the blocking order, the dolphins were subsequently exported while the court appeal was ongoing. One of the dolphins, Wen Wen, died on the flight to Singapore, making it the third dolphin to die prior to the opening of the Dolphin Island section within the park.

Adventure Cove Waterpark
The Adventure Cove Waterpark  is situated in southern Singapore. The park features seven water slides, including the region's first hydro-magnetic coaster, Riptide Rocket. It also features pools like Bluwater Bay, a wave pool and the Adventure River. The  river, one of the world's longest lazy-rivers, have 13 themed scenes of tropical jungles, grottoes, a surround aquarium and more.

Rides and attractions 
Rides and attractions include:

Dining 
The Bay Restaurant serves local favourites, Asian and Western delights. Dining is al-fresco style and situated on a terrace overlooking the Waterpark.

Shopping 
Reef 'n Wave Wear is a one-stop destination for swim apparel, gifts and souvenirs.

Transport 
The park is accessible by MRT (via the Sentosa Express), bus, car and by foot.

Gallery

See also
 Wild Wild Wet
 Underwater World

References

External links

 
 Resorts World Sentosa Official website

Water parks in Singapore
Oceanaria
2012 establishments in Singapore